Graham Wardle (born September 6, 1986) is a Canadian actor, filmmaker and photographer best known for his role as Ty Borden on the long running CBC series Heartland.

Early life 
Wardle was born in Mission, British Columbia, and was raised along with his five siblings in New Westminster, near Vancouver. Wardle studied at the Motion Picture and Production Program at Capilano University in Vancouver, graduating in 2007.

Career
Wardle began his career in commercials and a variety of television shows. In 2007, Wardle appeared in the film In the Land of Women with Meg Ryan and Adam Brody. That year, he was selected to play Ty Borden in the CBC series Heartland. Wardle was nominated for two LEO Awards for the Heartland episodes Summer's End and The Starting Gate. He has appeared in the horror zombie movie, Yesterday, the film Mon Ami, the television show Supernatural and the SyFy channel movie Grave Halloween. In 2020, Wardle left Heartland as it began its 14th season, stating "I felt in my heart it was time to move in a new direction."

In 2012, Wardle produced the short film The Vessel. In the summer of 2013, Wardle co-founded Lone Maverick, a Movie Production and Entertainment Company.

Wardle currently hosts a podcast, Time Has Come, which "explores the personal journeys of his guests and how they have stepped beyond what is familiar/safe and into the unknown."

Filmography

References

s External links 
 Graham Wardle Official Website
 
 CBC website

1986 births
Living people
Canadian male film actors
Canadian male television actors
Canadian people of Italian descent
Male actors from British Columbia
People from Mission, British Columbia
People from New Westminster
Canadian male child actors